Leonie Adele Spitzer (17 May 1891 – 5 June 1940) was an Austrian writer, poet, and educator.

Biography
Leonie Adele Spitzer was born into a distinguished assimilated Jewish family in Vienna. Her father was Obermedizinalrat Dr. Franz Spitzer, who worked as a physician for the  writers' and journalists' association, while her paternal grandfather was mathematician Simon Spitzer. Her mother Charlotte, was the daughter of Dr. Wilhelm Pokorny, homeopath and physician to the Austrian aristocracy.

Spitzer graduated with a doctorate from the University of Vienna on 21 July 1920, with a dissertation entitled "Über Rilkes Verskunst". She was editor of the Rikola publishing house until 1922, whereupon she pursued teaching as a profession. She passed the teacher's examination for gymnasia in 1923, and then worked at various secondary schools in Vienna, including the Floridsdorf Gymnasium.

She fled to Italy after the annexation of Austria into Nazi Germany in 1938 (her twin brother Dr. Fritz Spitzer, meanwhile, committed suicide). She received positions at Cheltenham Ladies' College and then Crofton Grange School, but soon succumbed to a serious illness and died in June 1940.

Because she was Jewish, Spitzer's doctorate was posthumously revoked on 22 July 1943, only to be symbolically re-granted on 15 May 1955.

Bibliography
 Sturmflut. Versdrama.
 Leonore. Novelle.

References

External links
 Poems by Spitzer at deutscher-liebeslyrik.de.

1891 births
1940 deaths
20th-century Austrian educators
20th-century Austrian poets
20th-century Austrian women writers
Austrian emigrants to England
Austrian women poets
Jewish Austrian writers
Jewish educators
Jewish emigrants from Austria to the United Kingdom after the Anschluss
Jewish women writers
Jews and Judaism in Vienna
Refugees in the United Kingdom
University of Vienna alumni